"You Send Me" is a song written and originally recorded by American singer Sam Cooke, released as a single in 1957 by Keen Records. Produced by Bumps Blackwell and arranged and conducted by René Hall. The song, Cooke's debut single, was a massive commercial success, becoming a  hit on both Billboard Rhythm & Blues Records chart and the Billboard Hot 100.

It was named as one of the 500 most important rock and roll recordings by the Rock & Roll Hall of Fame. In April 2010, the song ranked  in Rolling Stone magazine's The 500 Greatest Songs of All Time.

In addition to the original version of Sam Cooke, "You Send Me" has received numerous covers over the years, the most important being the versions of Teresa Brewer (1957), Aretha Franklin (1968), Ponderosa Twins Plus One (1971) and The Manhattans (1985).

Sam Cooke version (1957)

Background
Cooke wrote "You Send Me" but gave the writing credit to his younger brother L.C. (who used the original family spelling "Cook") because he did not want his own publisher to profit from the song. He had also hoped L.C. would record the song himself. Cooke made a demo recording of the song featuring only his own guitar accompaniment in the winter of 1955. The first recording of the track was made in New Orleans in December 1956 in the same sessions which produced "Lovable", the first release outside the gospel field for Cooke (credited on that single as Dale Cook). The classic version of "You Send Me" was cut in Los Angeles in June 1957 and was issued as a single with another track from the same session: a version of "Summertime", as the debut release on the Keen label founded by brothers John and Alex Siamas; this release marked the first single credited to "Sam Cooke" (whose true surname was Cook). Although "Summertime" was the intended A-side, disc jockeys favored "You Send Me", which broke nationally that October to reach  for a two-week stay in December 1957, with sales estimated at a 1.5 million units. "Overnight, with a single song, Sam Cooke"—who had spent the summer of 1957 living in his producer's apartment—"became a secular superstar, with audiences consisting of black and white, men and women, young and old."

As was common practice in the 1950s when it was unusual for hits in the black R&B market to crossover to the Pop charts, a cover version of "You Send Me" aimed at the Pop charts was cut by the white singer Teresa Brewer and released in October 1957. Symptomatic of the changing music scene, Cooke's original was able to repeat its  R&B chart performance in the Pop field, eclipsing Brewer's version.

Acclaim
Since its release, the song has become a landmark record of the soul genre, which Cooke helped create. It was named as one of the 500 most important rock and roll recordings by the Rock & Roll Hall of Fame. In 2005, the song was voted  by representatives of the music industry and press in Rolling Stone magazine's The 500 Greatest Songs of All Time.

B-side
The B-side of Sam Cooke's original single "You Send Me" contains a cover version of the song "Summertime", which was also recorded by Cooke in 1957 for the album Songs by Sam Cooke. It was written between 1933 and 1934 by George Gershwin and DuBose Heyward (also co-credited to Ira Gershwin). The song was originally recorded in 1935 by Abbie Mitchell for the musical opera Porgy and Bess. Sam Cooke's version for "Summertime" was also released as a single and reached  on the US chart Billboard Hot 100.

Chart Positions

Personnel
On "You Send Me" and "Summertime":
Sam Cooke - lead vocals
René Hall - arrangement and rhythm guitar
 Clifton White, René Hall - guitar
Ted Brinson - bass
Earl Palmer - drums
Lee Gotch, The Pied Pipers - backing vocals
Bob Kidder - engineer
Robert Blackwell - producer

The Manhattans version (1985)

"You Send Me" was covered in 1985 by popular American R&B vocal group The Manhattans, whose version was recorded for the album Too Hot to Stop It, released the same year. This new version of the song was also released as a single and charted on the major music charts of the United States, Canada and New Zealand.

Chart Positions

Personnel
 Lead vocal – Gerald Alston
 Backing vocals – Winfred "Blue" Lovett, Edward "Sonny" Bivins, Kenneth "Wally" Kelly
 Writer – Sam Cooke
 Producer – Morrie Brown
 Arranged By (Background Vocals) – Morrie Brown, Winfred Lovett
 Arranged By (Rhythm), Drum Programming – Lloyd Landesman, Morrie Brown
 Keyboards, Synthesizer – Lloyd Landesman
 Soloist, Saxophone – Chris Cioe
 Synthesizer (Strings) – Morrie Brown
 Recorded at Celestial Studios
 Produced for Mighty M Productions, Ltd.

B-side
The B-side of the 7" single contains the song "You're Gonna Love Being Loved By Me" which was also recorded by The Manhattans in 1985 for the album Too Hot to Stop It It was written by lead vocalist Gerald Alston, with Barbara Morr and Mark Chapman, and produced by the musicians John V. Anderson and Steve Williams, authors of "Crazy".

Track listing

7" Single

The full length of "You Send Me" on the album Too Hot to Stop It is 4:10. The length of 3:50 on the single is an edited version of the song.

12" Single

Other cover versions

Overview
"You Send Me" has been covered by a number of artists across different fields of music, including Jesse Belvin (1957), Nat King Cole, Teresa Brewer, Michael Bolton, The Drifters, The Everly Brothers, The Four Seasons, Bobby Vee (1960), José Feliciano, Aretha Franklin, Steven Houghton, Nicolette Larson, Steve Miller Band, Van Morrison, Otis Redding, Sam & Dave, Percy Sledge, Roy Ayers, Paul & Paula (1963), The Supremes, The Manhattans, Rachelle Ferrell, Fairground Attraction, Marcia Hines, Whitney Houston, Gregory Porter (2016), the Chicks, Ponderosa Twins Plus One, Lynda Carter from At Last (2009) and Judie Tzuke on The Beauty Of Hindsight (2003).

Stewart later recorded the song with Chaka Khan for his 2005 album Thanks for the Memory: The Great American Songbook, Volume IV.

In Hong Kong, the song was covered by Deanie Ip in Cantonese with name "飄" in 1985.

Other chart performance

Teresa Brewer version

Aretha Franklin version

Ponderosa Twins Plus One version

See also
List of Billboard number-one rhythm and blues hits
List of Billboard number-one singles of 1957
Billboard year-end top 50 singles of 1957
List of Cash Box Best Sellers number-one singles of 1957
List of CHUM number-one singles of 1957

References

Bibliography
 Portrait of a Legend 1951-1964. Abkco Records, 2003. Los Angeles, California.

External links
 

1957 songs
1957 singles
1968 singles
1985 singles
Sam Cooke songs
The Manhattans songs
Teresa Brewer songs
Aretha Franklin songs
Rod Stewart songs
Soul ballads
Rhythm and blues ballads
Songs written by Sam Cooke
Grammy Hall of Fame Award recipients
Billboard Top 100 number-one singles
Keen Records singles